Vince Ferraro is an American business executive best known for his global marketing vice president positions with Hewlett-Packard and Eastman Kodak.

Education
Vince Ferraro graduated from San Diego State University with a Bachelor of Science degree in business administration and an MBA from Arizona State University.

Career with HP
Ferraro started working for Hewlett-Packard in 1983 as a senior financial analyst. He would be promoted to several management and executive positions over the years, including North American channel marketing director for commercial national accounts and vice president of marketing for several divisions of the company. In addition to marketing, he used his blog to help problem solve compatibility problems between HP products and Microsoft Vista. In 2007 and 2008 Ferraro was a speaker at the Chief Marketing Officer Council summit. Ferraro spent over twenty-five years with the company and eventually retired from HP as VP of Worldwide Marketing for the LaserJet business in 2008.

Later career
In 2011 Ferraro made national news when he attempted to trademark Occupy Wall Street. His attempt to purchase the trademark was not on behalf of any corporation, however he stated to the Wall Street Journal law blog that, "Filing this claim has nothing to with their cause. I have no comment about their political grievances or organization. I’m not in any way affiliated with them ... I just see alternative uses for the trademark."

After leaving HP Ferraro worked for several smaller companies as am interim marketing executive and consultant, until taking the position of Vice President of Marketing for the digital printing solutions business of Eastman Kodak. In this position, Ferraro has served as a spokesman for new Kodak products as they are revealed annually. Under his direction, in 2011 the company won nineteen awards from the International Association of Printing House Craftsmen. He was eventually promoted to Vice President of Corporate and Consumer Marketing at Kodak. He is also a long-time member of the Chief Marketing Officer Council Advisory Board. He is also a Springboard Business Advisor for the Connection Foundation.

Authored books 
Ferraro has authored or co-authored 2 non-fiction books since 2012.

 In It To Win It (co-author). CelebrityPress, May 2012 
 Brand to Sell Masterplan. Abundant Press, November 2015

References

American business executives
Kodak people
Hewlett-Packard people
Living people
W. P. Carey School of Business alumni
San Diego State University alumni
Year of birth missing (living people)